Jazz Advance is the debut album by pianist Cecil Taylor, recorded for the Transition label in September 1956. The album features performances by Taylor with Buell Neidlinger, Denis Charles and Steve Lacy.

Music 
The album contains three Taylor originals, three standards, and one standard-to-be, Thelonious Monk's "Bemsha Swing", first recorded only four years before Taylor's version. This track is played "cryptically and succinctly, the lines breaking up into jagged fragments and jutting chords". "Charge 'Em Blues" is in 4/4 time. The chords and light treble playing towards the beginning of "Azure" are similar to the sound of Abdullah Ibrahim, but then "the cross-rhythmic improvised piano patterns clattering chords typical of later Taylor emerge".

Reception 

The Penguin Guide to Jazz selected the album as part of its suggested "Core Collection", stating "Taylor's first record remains one of the most extraordinary debuts in jazz, and for 1956 it's an incredible effort." The AllMusic review by Michael G. Nastos states "Though many did not understand his approach at the time, the passing years temper scathing criticism, and you can easily appreciate what he is accomplishing... With Jazz Advance, the revolution commenced, Taylor was setting the pace, and the improvised music world has never been the same. For challenged listeners, this CD has to be high on your must have list". The album was identified by Chris Kelsey in his AllMusic essay "Free Jazz: A Subjective History" as one of the 20 Essential Free Jazz Albums.

Track listing 
All compositions by Cecil Tayor except as indicated
 "Bemsha Swing" (Denzil Best, Thelonious Monk) – 7:29
 "Charge 'Em Blues" – 11:07
 "Azure" (Duke Ellington, Irving Mills) – 7:29
 "Song" – 5:21
 "You'd Be So Nice to Come Home To" (Cole Porter) – 9:18
 "Rick Kick Shaw" – 6:06
 "Sweet and Lovely" (Gus Arnheim, Jules LeMare, Harry Tobias) – 6:36
Recorded in Boston on September 14, 1956

Personnel 
 Cecil Taylor – piano
 Buell Neidlinger – bass
 Denis Charles – drums
 Steve Lacy – soprano saxophone (tracks 2 & 4)

References 

1957 debut albums
Cecil Taylor albums
Albums produced by Tom Wilson (record producer)
Transition Records albums